Thunbergia natalensis is a species of flowering plant in the family Acanthaceae, that is native to parts of mainland Africa, including South Africa (Limpopo, Mpulamanga, KwaZulu-Natal, East Cape Province), Eswatini, Tanzania, Ethiopia, Malawi and Zimbabwe. It occurs in forest margins, bush and grassland. Normally evergreen, it responds to dry or cold winters by losing its leaves and going dormant.  Common names include dwarf thunbergia, Natal blue thunbergia and Natal blue-bell. 

This handsome plant is cultivated in temperate regions for its masses of summer-flowering pale blue, trumpet-shaped blooms against dark hairy leaves.

References

Flora of Swaziland
Flora of Ethiopia
Flora of Malawi
Flora of South Africa
Flora of Tanzania
Flora of Zimbabwe
natalensis